Celtic Weekly Newspapers is a series of seven weekly newspapers published in south Wales by Media Wales Ltd (formerly Western Mail & Echo Ltd), part of Reach plc.

The titles in the series are:
Cynon Valley Leader
Glamorgan Gazette
Gwent Gazette
Merthyr Express
Pontypridd & Llantrisant Observer
Rhondda Leader
Rhymney Valley Express

The Neath Guardian - which also had a Port Talbot edition - was part of the series until its closure in October 2009.

See also
List of newspapers in Wales

External links
icWales: Around Wales

Newspapers published in Wales
Newspapers published by Reach plc